"Salt Peanuts" is a bebop tune reportedly composed by Dizzy Gillespie in 1942, credited "with the collaboration of" drummer Kenny Clarke. It is also cited as Charlie Parker's. The original lyrics have no exophoric meaning. Instead, they are a skat/bebop vocal which matches the octave note interval played predominantly throughout the song. The Pointer Sisters subsequently included vocalese lyrics for their rendition of Salt Peanuts as recorded on their That's a Plenty album.

Composition 
"Salt Peanuts" is a contrafact of "I Got Rhythm": it has the same 32-bar AABA structure and harmony, but its melody is different. It is a simple piece – "a four-measure riff phrase played twice in each A section, and a slightly more complex bridge (which incorporates the ubiquitous 9–7–8 figure twice)".

While the verbal exhortation "Salt Peanuts, Salt Peanuts!" is closely identified with Dizzy Gillespie, the musical motif upon which it is based predates Gillespie/Clarke. Glenn Miller recorded sound-alike "WHAM (Re-Bop-Boom-Bam)" on August 1, 1941, and prior to this it appeared as a repeated six-note instrumental phrase played on piano by Count Basie on his July 2, 1941 recording of "Basie Boogie". Basie also played it in a recorded live performance at Cafe Society later that year.

The refrain also appears in the song "Five Salted Peanuts" by Charlie Abbott and Bert Wheeler which was recorded by both Tony Pastor & His Orchestra and The Counts & The Countess in 1945.

Performances
The first known recording was by Georgie Auld, Coleman Hawkins and Ben Webster as the Auld-Hawkins-Webster Saxtet, released on the Apollo label in 1944. Bebop historian Thomas Owens described the version recorded by Dizzy Gillespie and His All-Stars in May 1945 as "the definitive version". The lineup was Gillespie (trumpet), Charlie Parker (alto sax), Al Haig (piano), Curley Russell (bass), and Sid Catlett (drums).

In 1978, then-President Jimmy Carter sang the two-word lyric of "Salt Peanuts" with Gillespie in a White House concert. This was the first White House Jazz Concert and was the only time that a president has performed a jazz song while in office. According to Gillespie, Carter (who was also nicknamed "The Peanut Farmer") requested the song, and Gillespie responded that he would "play it if he [President Carter] will come up here and sing it with us."

See also
 List of jazz contrafacts
 Jazz at Massey Hall
 Groovin' High (Dizzy Gillespie album)
 Dispute over the definition of jazz in France in 1945 when Hugues Panassié first heard "Salt Peanuts".

References

1942 songs
1940s jazz standards
Bebop jazz standards
Compositions by Dizzy Gillespie
Jazz compositions in F major